Shozo Ishihara (10 August 1910 – 19 July 1993) was a Japanese speed skater who competed in the 1932 and 1936 Winter Olympics.

He was born in the Tochigi Prefecture.

In 1932 he participated in the 500 metres competition, in the 1500 metres event, in the 5000 metres competition, and in the 10000 metres event, but was eliminated in the heats in all four contests.

Four years later he finished fourth in the 500 metres competition and 19th in the 1500 metres event.

External links
Speed skating 1932+1936 
Shozo Ishihara's profile at Sports Reference.com

1910 births
1993 deaths
Japanese male speed skaters
Speed skaters at the 1932 Winter Olympics
Speed skaters at the 1936 Winter Olympics
Olympic speed skaters of Japan
Waseda University alumni
Sportspeople from Tochigi Prefecture
20th-century Japanese people